Atik may refer to:

 Atik (name), an Arabic given name or surname, including a list of people with the name
 Atik, the proper name of the primary component of the binary star Omicron Persei
 Atik railway station, in Manitoba, Canada
 Atik Yomin or "Ancient of Days", Aramaic name for God in the Book of Daniel
 USS Atik (AK-101), a Q-ship of the United States Navy
 ATIK, a chain of British nightclubs owned by Rekom UK